de Lancie is a surname. Notable people with the name include:

 John de Lancie, character actor best known for his role as recurring guest star Q on the various Star Trek series
 John de Lancie (oboist), the principal oboist of the Philadelphia Orchestra for many years
 Keegan de Lancie, American actor and son of actor John de Lancie and Marnie Mosiman

See also
 Lancié, French commune